Gros Morne Golf Resort, is a public golf course located near the town of St. Paul's on the Great Northern Peninsula in Newfoundland, Canada.

History
Located adjacent to the northern part of Gros Morne National Park, Gros Morne Resort is a full service resort complete with conference facilities. The resort opened in 2005 with a 9-hole course and was developed into a full 18-hole course in 2010.
The Gros Morne Resort experienced a tragic fire on December 20, 2011 destroying the full motel section of the resort.

See also
List of golf courses in Newfoundland and Labrador

References

External links
Official website

Golf clubs and courses in Newfoundland and Labrador
2005 establishments in Newfoundland and Labrador